Bogdašić  is a village in the municipality of Tomislavgrad in Canton 10, the Federation of Bosnia and Herzegovina, Bosnia and Herzegovina. The village is located on the hill in the upper part of Šujica Valley.

Demographics 

404 residents lived in the village in 1991. By 2013 that number decreased to 346. All residents identified themselves as Croats.

Footnotes

Bibliography 

 

Populated places in Tomislavgrad